West Dallas Kings were an American soccer team, founded in 2001 by Michael Gordon, Reagan Angell, and David Angell, who were members of the United Soccer Leagues Premier Development League (PDL), the fourth tier of the American Soccer Pyramid, for only one season.  Coached by Jim Benedek.

Year-by-year

References

Soccer clubs in Dallas
Defunct Premier Development League teams
2001 establishments in Texas
2001 disestablishments in Texas
Association football clubs established in 2001
Association football clubs disestablished in 2001